Edward A. Harrison (December 3, 1902-May, 1981) was an American professional football player who spend one season in the National Football League with the Brooklyn Lions in 1926, appearing in three games while making one start.

References

1902 births
1981 deaths
Brooklyn Lions players
Boston College alumni
Players of American football from New York (state)